The 2013–14 Liga Nacional de Básquet season was the 30th season of the top professional basketball league in Argentina. The regular season started on 9 October 2013. Peñarol won their fifth title, defeating defending champions Regatas Corrientes in the finals. This was the first season without relegations to the Torneo Nacional de Ascenso.

Promotions and relegations
Torneo Nacional de Ascenso Champions from the previous season Estudiantes Concordia and runners-up Quilmes were promoted.

Clubs

Regular season

First stage
The first stage took place between 10 October and 24 November 2013. Teams were divided into two zones. The top four teams from each zone competed in the Torneo Súper 8 that took place in December.

North Zone

South Zone

Torneo Súper 8
The ninth edition of Torneo Súper 8 took place on 18–21 December 2013 in the city of San Martín, Mendoza. Peñarol won their fourth title, defeating Quimsa in the Final, and were granted a berth in the 2014 Liga Sudamericana de Básquetbol.

Second stage
The second stage started on 28 November 2013. All 16 teams were ranked together. Each team carried over half of the points obtained in the first stage.

Playoffs
The Playoffs started on 9 April 2014 and ended on 5 June 2014. Peñarol defeated Regatas Corrientes in the Finals and won their fifth title. Both teams were qualified for the 2015 FIBA Americas League. Since Peñarol had also qualified to the 2014 Liga Sudamericana de Básquetbol after winning the Torneo Súper 8, their berth was given to the next best team that was not qualified yet, in this case Libertad.

Clubs in international competitions

Awards

Yearly Awards
Most Valuable Player: Walter Herrmann, Atenas
Best Foreign Player:  Walter Baxley, Quilmes
Sixth Man of the Year: Marcos Delía, Boca Juniors
Rookie of the Year: Matías Bortolín, Regatas Corrientes
Coach of the Year: Nicolás Casalánguida, Regatas Corrientes
Most Improved Player: Fernando Martina, Regatas Corrientes
All-Tournament Team:
 F Walter Herrmann, Atenas
 F Leonardo Gutiérrez, Peñarol
 C Sam Clancy Jr., Gimnasia Indalo
 G Facundo Campazzo, Peñarol
 G Paolo Quinteros, Regatas Corrientes

References

Liga Nacional de Básquet seasons
   
Argentina